Amil Kahala Whitehead (born September 19, 1973) is an American former rapper and singer. She was prominent in the late 1990s as a Jay-Z protégé, and recorded the single "Can I Get A..." with him for the Rush Hour soundtrack.

Amil's debut studio album, All Money Is Legal (2000), peaked at number 45 on the US Billboard 200 chart and spawned two successful singles – "I Got That" (with vocals from Beyoncé) and "4 da Fam".

Career 
In 1997, Amil was involved with an all-female group called "Major Coins". The group met Jay-Z, who was looking for a woman to provide vocals on his third album, Vol. 2... Hard Knock Life. The part for the female rapper was really for her friend, but when Jay-Z asked Amil to freestyle and liked it, he decided to put her on the song instead. Amil, wanting to remain loyal to her friend, did not prefer to be put on the song, but Jay-Z allowed them both to do a version of the song.

Soon after Major Coins broke up, Amil decided to follow a solo career with Jay-Z's label, Roc-A-Fella Records, joining the 1999 Hard Knock Life Tour. After the tour, she appeared on songs with Mariah Carey, Beyoncé, Jermaine Dupri, AZ, DJ Kay Slay, LL Cool J and Funkmaster Flex.

Throughout her career, she has appeared on many songs with Jay-Z, including "Nigga What, Nigga Who" which also featured Jaz-O, the hit-single, "Can I Get A..." featuring Ja Rule, and other collaborations such as "Hey Papi", "Do It Again (Put Ya Hands Up)", "S Carter", "Heard It All", "You, Me, Him and Her", "That's Right", "Playa" and lastly, "4 Da Fam" and "For My Thugs" which both featured Memphis Bleek and Beanie Siegel. In 2000, Amil released her debut solo album, A.M.I.L – All Money Is Legal.

All Money Is Legal 
Her solo debut, A.M.I.L – All Money Is Legal, was released on August 29, 2000. The album featured the single "I Got That", a duet with Beyoncé, and All-Star Roc-A-Fella single "4 Da Fam". The album also features Memphis Bleek, Jay-Z, Carl Thomas, Eve, and Beanie Sigel.
Amil is a practicing Black Hebrew Israelite and her affiliation is evident on songs such as "Quarrels".
Album sales were disappointing, and the singles did not sell well either. Following that album, her last Roc-A-Fella/Def Jam single, "Hey Papi", a song from the soundtrack to the feature film Nutty Professor II: The Klumps, was released. Due to the fact that she was featured in the video only briefly, it was expected that she had already been dropped by that time. In 2002, Amil had a small role in State Property along with other Roc-a-Fella members such as Damon Dash and Jay-Z.

Later career 
In 2005, Amil temporarily re-formed "Major Coinz" and released songs on the mixtape circuit including the single "Glamorous Life" which was featured on MTV's Mixtape Monday.

In a 2006 interview, when asked whether female MCs are forced to meet standards that male MCs are not, she said: "Oh, yeah. Definitely. You have to be picture-perfect and you have to meet the standards of the perfect woman. That's unreal to me. Real women do not have plastic-looking bodies. The average woman is not a size 0. You can do what you have to do to keep yourself looking like that or you could just be you. Me, I choose to just be me." She went on to say that she holds no grudges against her former labelmates, though she has no communication with them.

In 2008, Amil released mixtapes titled Az Iz and Amil Returns: The Lost Classics Edition, delivering lyrically with songs such as the emotional "Tears of a Teenage Mother" and the Caribbean vibed "Don't Worry".

In August 2011, Amil spoke out through Vibe Magazine and gave the following statement about Jay-Z: "I haven't spoken to Jay in years but I really wish I could talk to him because that would just really bring closure to me. But he knows I love him. People think there was bad blood between us, but there never was any bad blood. Things happen and I wasn't ready for where my career was going at that time. It was really overwhelming."

Amil released a new song called "Stop" in July 2012. The song was intended to promote the rapper's unreleased mixtape, A Time to Kill. Amil released the song "Remember" in 2014. It was also intended to promote a mixtape titled Another Moment in Life, which remains unreleased.

Discography

Albums

Singles

Album appearances

References

External links 
 VH1 Artist biography
 Hip Hop Game – Interview with Amil

American women rappers
1973 births
African-American women singer-songwriters
African-American women rappers
Living people
Rappers from New York City
Roc-A-Fella Records artists
American hip hop singers
East Coast hip hop musicians
Hardcore hip hop artists
Columbia Records artists
21st-century American rappers
21st-century women rappers
American women hip hop singers
21st-century African-American women singers
20th-century African-American women singers
Singer-songwriters from New York (state)